The use of high-probability request sequences is one of several strategies used by educators and others to promote and maintain desired behaviors in children and in adults with developmental disabilities. A high-probability request involves the learner complying willingly under most conditions.  In contrast, a low-probability request is one that often results in a challenging or inappropriate behavior. The high-probability request sequence involves both kinds of requests.

When using this strategy, an educator or parent first chooses a "target" behavior that is not usually performed when requested. Then the educator quickly asks the learner to do several tasks usually done willingly (the "high-probability requests"), followed immediately by an instruction that's more difficult or less popular (the "low-probability request"). The learner is praised or rewarded after complying with each request.  The effectiveness of this approach in leading the learner to identify the target behavior with the previous behaviors, and thus perform it more readily when asked, has been the subject of a number of research studies.

References

See also 
 Compliance (psychology)
 Shaping (psychology)

Education theory
Behavior modification